Patrick Hamill (April 28, 1817 – January 15, 1895) was a U.S. Congressman from the fourth district of Maryland, serving one term from 1869 to 1871.

Hamill attended the common schools in Westernport, Maryland, and engaged in the real estate business and mercantile pursuits, and was collector of taxes in 1841 and 1842.  He served as a member of the Maryland House of Delegates in 1843 and 1844, and was a judge of the orphans’ court of Allegany County, Maryland, from 1854 until 1869, and elected chief judge in 1867. He was elected as a Democrat to the Forty-first Congress, serving from March 4, 1869, until March 3, 1871, but was not a candidate for renomination in 1870. He later engaged in the real estate business until his death in Oakland, Maryland, and is interred in Odd Fellows Cemetery.

References

1817 births
1895 deaths
Maryland state court judges
Democratic Party members of the Maryland House of Delegates
Democratic Party members of the United States House of Representatives from Maryland
People from Westernport, Maryland
19th-century American politicians
19th-century American judges